R. E. Shope can refer to two virologists:

Richard Shope, influenza and papillomavirus researcher
Robert Shope, arbovirologist and emerging infectious disease specialist